In geology, the term Torridonian is the informal name for the Torridonian Group, a series of Mesoproterozoic to Neoproterozoic arenaceous and argillaceous sedimentary rocks, which occur extensively in the Northwest Highlands of Scotland. The strata of the Torridonian Group are particularly well exposed in the district of upper Loch Torridon, a circumstance which suggested the name Torridon Sandstone, first applied to these rocks by James Nicol. Stratigraphically, they lie unconformably on gneisses of the Lewisian complex and their outcrop extent is restricted to the Hebridean Terrane.

Rock type
The rocks are mainly red and brown sandstones, arkoses and shales with coarse conglomerates locally at the base. Some of the materials of these rocks were derived from the underlying Lewisian gneiss, upon the uneven surface of which they rest, but the bulk of the material was obtained from rocks that are nowhere now exposed. Upon this ancient denuded land surface the Torridonian strata rest horizontally or with gentle inclination. Some of the peaks, such as Beinn Eighe, are capped with white Cambrian quartzite, giving them a distinctive appearance when seen from afar. Some of the quartzite contains fossilized worm burrows and is known as pipe rock. It is circa 500 million years old. The Torridon landscape is itself highly denuded by glacial and alluvial action, and represents the remnants of an ancient peneplain.

Occurrence

Their outcrop extends in a belt of variable breadth from Cape Wrath to the Point of the peninsula of Sleat in Skye, running in a N.N.E.-S.S.W. direction through Caithness, Sutherland, Ross and Cromarty, and Skye and Lochalsh. They form the isolated mountain peaks of Canisp, Quinag and Suilven in the area of Loch Assynt, of Slioch near Loch Maree, and other hills. They attain their maximum development in the Applecross, Gairloch and Torridon districts, form the greater part of Scalpay, and occur also in Rùm, Raasay, Soay and the Crowlin Islands. They are also found beneath much of the Sea of the Hebrides overlying the Lewisian gneiss.

Sub-divisions
The Torridonian is divided into the older Stoer Group and the younger Sleat and Torridon Groups separated by an angular unconformity. Paleomagnetic data suggest that this unconformity represents a major time break. These sediments are interpreted to have been deposited during a period of rifting.

Stoer Group
The Stoer Group outcrops on the peninsula of Stoer, near Assynt, Sutherland. It is subdivided into three formations.

Clachtoll Formation
A basal breccia is present in many areas with large clasts derived from the underlying Lewisian. There is local evidence of weathering of the gneiss beneath the unconformity. Away from the unconformity the breccia becomes crudely stratified within an overall fining upwards sequence passing up into pebbly sandstones, the deposits of small alluvial fans. This breccia facies passes vertically and laterally in most places into muddy massive sandstones, true greywackes. The lower part of these sandstones are almost unbedded being replaced upwards by half metre thick beds capped by siltstones often with well-preserved desiccation structures.  In parts of the outcrop, the muddy sandstones are succeeded by the deposits of a braided river system, trough cross-bedded sandstones and conglomerates.

Bay of Stoer Formation
The Bay of Stoer Formation consists of a lower section formed of red trough cross-bedded sandstones with some pebbles, interpreted to be the deposits of a braided river system. The uppermost 100 m of the formation, the Stac Fada and Poll a' Mhuilt members, form a distinctive marker layer within the Stoer Group succession with a strike extent of 50 km. The Stac Fada Member is generally about 10 m thick and consists of muddy sandstone facies with abundant clasts of vesicular volcanic glass, locally with accretionary lapilli. The matrix for these volcanic clasts is always non-volcanic suggesting transport from the area where they were erupted. The member also includes large rafts of gneiss and sandstone, up to 15 m in length. The Stac Fada member has been traditionally interpreted to be a mudflow. An alternative suggestion has been that the member represents part of the proximal ejecta blanket from an impact crater. This interpretation is supported by the presence of shocked quartz and biotite. The overlying Poll a' Mhuilt member consists of a thin sequence of siltstones and fine sandstones alternating with muddy sandstones, suggesting deposition in a lacustrine environment.

Meall Dearg Formation
The uppermost part of the sequence consists of trough cross-bedded sandstones thought to have been deposited by braided rivers, similar to the lower part of the Bay of Stoer Formation, possibly with wider channels and a lower paleoslope.

Sleat Group
The Sleat Group, which outcrops on the Sleat peninsula on Skye, underlies the Torridon Group conformably, but the relationship with the Stoer Group is nowhere exposed. It is presumed to have been deposited later than the Stoer Group, but possibly in a separate sub-basin. It is metamorphosed to greenschist facies and sits within the Kishorn Nappe, part of the Caledonian thrust belt, making its exact relationship to the other outcrops difficult to assess. The sequence consists of mainly coarse feldspathic sandstones deposited in a fluvial environment with some less common grey shales, probably deposited in a lacustrine environment.

Rubha Guail Formation
The unconformity at the base of the Sleat Group is not exposed on Skye, but at Kyle of Lochalsh, the basal part of the sequence is seen to consist of breccias, with clasts derived from the underlying gneiss. Topographic relief on the unconformity reaches several hundred metres.
Most of the remaining part of the formation consists of coarse green trough cross-bedded sandstones, the colour coming from its content of epidote and chlorite. The coarse sandstone beds are interbedded with fine-grained sandstones and siltstones, which become more common towards the top of the formation. The siltstones show desiccation features. The formation shows an overall upward-fining trend, which continued with the overlying Loch na Dal Formation siltstones.

Loch na Dal Formation
The basal part of this formation is formed of laminated dark-grey siltstones. This 200 m thick unit is often phosphatic and contains occasional coarse to very coarse sandstone laminae. It is interpreted to represent the maximum expansion of a lake. The upper part of the formation is composed mainly of coarse, occasionally pebbly, trough cross-bedded sandstones, interpreted to record the building out of a series of deltas into the earlier lake.

Beinn na Seamraig Formation
This formation consist of coarse-grained cross-bedded sandstones, typically showing contorted bedding.

Kinloch Formation
This formation is similar to the underlying Beinn na Seamraig Formation. The main difference is that the sandstones are generally finer-grained than those below and have better developed ripple-drift lamination. The sediments show marked cyclicity, with fining upward cycles, 25–35 m thick, with shales developed at the top. The uppermost boundary of this group with the overlying Torridon Group has been interpreted to be conformable, with evidence of interfingering between the Kinloch Formation shales and Applecross Formation sandstones. In support of this observation, there are no sandstone clasts above the boundary and no change in magnetisation between the formations. The main difference is in the degree of albitisation of the feldspars; those in the Sleat Group are only partially affected, while those in the Applecross Formation are completely albitised. There is also some evidence for a change in bedding orientation across the boundary, which is nowhere well-exposed, suggesting that it may represent some sort of disconformity.

Torridon Group

The Torridon Group infills an irregular land surface with up to 600 m of topography locally, cutting down through the previously deposited Stoer group sediments, resting in many areas directly on the Lewisian. It has been suggested that there is significant unconformity within this group, between the Diabaig and Applecross Formations.

Diabaig Formation
The lowest part of this formation consists of a basal breccia containing clasts derived from the underlying Lewisian complex with the thickest developments in the paleovalleys. The breccias passing vertically and laterally into tabular sandstones. These are locally channelised and interfinger with grey shales containing thin beds of fine-grained sandstone with wave rippled surfaces. The shales show the effects of desiccation with mudcracks preserved by being filled by overlying sandstone layers. In the upper part of the formation, beds of massive sandstone with sharp bases appear, becoming more common and thicker bedded towards the top. Ripple-drift lamination at the top of the sandstone layers indicates deposition from easterly-flowing currents. This sequence is interpreted to be to represent the progressive infill of the topography by alluvial fans building out into ephemeral lakes. The more massive beds are interpreted to be lake turbidites.

Applecross Formation
This formation consists of coarse sandstones, both trough and planar cross-bedded. The orientation of the troughs suggest a paleocurrent flowing from the Northwest. The sandstones carry a distinctive set of pebbles, including jasper and porphyry. Most of the sandstone beds are affected by soft-sediment deformation structures suggesting liquefaction, possibly as a result of seismic activity. The uppermost part of the formation consists of finer-grained sandstones, transitional to those of the overlying Aultbea Formation. At Cape Wrath the basal part of the formation shows a fanning of paleocurrent directions consistent with deposition from a large alluvial fan (~40 km radius) with its apex near the Minch Fault. The source area for this fan has been calculated as about 10,000 km2.

Aultbea Formation

This formation is similar to the Applecross formation except that the sandstones are fine to medium-grained and there are very few pebbles. Almost all of these sandstone beds show the contortions shown by the older formation.
The Applecross and Aultbea Formations together consist of an overall fining-upward sequence of sandstones. Only the outcrops at Cape Wrath described above have a consistent radial pattern suggesting that the sequence was deposited in a bajada environment, by a series of smaller fans merging to form a braided river system.

Cailleach Head Formation
This formation is similar to the underlying Aultbea Formation, the main difference being in grain size, with this formation being noticeably finer-grained. The sequence is made up of 22 m thick cycles, each with a basal erosion surface followed by dark grey shales with desiccation cracks, planar cross-bedded sandstones with wave rippled tops, overlain by trough cross-bedded micaceous sandstones. These cycles are thought to represent repeated progradation of deltas into a lake. A lack of evaporite minerals suggest that the lakes had through drainage. Acritarch microfossils were described from here by Teall in 1907, the first Precambrian fossils described in Britain.

Age
The upper age limit for the deposition of this sequence is constrained by the age of the last tectonic and metamorphic event to affect the Lewisian complex on which it was deposited, for which ages cluster between about 1200–1100 Ma. The lower limit is provided by the age of the lower Cambrian quartzite that lies above it, about 544 Ma. Radiometric ages from the Torridonian sequence itself give ages of about 1200 Ma for the Stoer Group and 1000–950 for the basal part of the Torridon Group. This implies an age gap of at least 200 Ma between the deposition of these two groups, consistent with the paleomagnetic evidence. Ages of detrital zircons also provide some constraints on the sequence age. The Stoer group and the lower part of the Sleat Group show ages consistent with derivation from Scourian and to a lesser extent Laxfordian rocks, with no dates after 1700 Ma. The upper part of the Sleat Group includes a large component of broadly Laxfordian age with almost no Archaean ages, with a lower limit of about 1200 Ma.  In contrast the Diabaig Formation shows a small group clustered around 1100 Ma, the age of the Grenville Orogeny. In the Applecross and Aultbea Formations there are many more zircons giving ages around 1100 Ma and even below 1000 Ma. This evidence suggest that the Stour and Sleat Groups were deposited before the Grenvillian event, pre-1200 Ma, while the Diabaig Formation was deposited after the orogeny, after about 1090 Ma, and the remaining parts of the Torridon Group after about 1060 Ma. A more precise age has been obtained for authigenic feldspars in the Stac Fada Member of the Stoer Group at 1177±5 Ma interpreted to have formed immediately after emplacement of the ejecta blanket.

Tectonic setting
Variations in thickness and lithology are consistent with both the Stoer and Sleat/Torridon Groups being deposited in a rift setting. Evidence from seismic reflection data in the Minch suggests that the Minch Fault was active throughout the deposition of the Torridon Group. This is consistent with the generally westerly derived pebbly material throughout the thickness of the Applecross Formation, suggesting a constantly rejuvenated sediment source in that direction. More recent work has suggested that although the Stoer and Sleat Groups were probably deposited in a rift setting, the scale and continuity of the Torridon Group, particularly the Applecross and Aultbea Formations, is more consistent with a molasse type setting possibly related to the Grenville Orogeny.

References

Sandstone in the United Kingdom
Geology of Scotland
Caithness
Sutherland
Ross and Cromarty
Skye and Lochalsh
Stratigraphy of the United Kingdom
Torridon